Takhteh Sang-e Sofla (also Romanized as Takhteh Sang-e Soflá) is a village in Banesh Rural District, Beyza District, Sepidan County, Fars Province, Iran. At the 2006 census, its population was 228, in 56 families.

References 

Populated places in Beyza County